Taufik Kurniawan (22 November 1967 – 24 November 2022) was an Indonesian politician. A member of the National Mandate Party, he served as a deputy speaker of the People's Representative Council from 2010 to 2019.

Kurniawan died in Semarang on 24 November 2022, at the age of 55.

References

1967 births
2022 deaths
National Mandate Party politicians
Indonesian politicians
Diponegoro University alumni
Javanese people
People from Semarang
Members of the People's Representative Council, 2004
Members of the People's Representative Council, 2009
Members of the People's Representative Council, 2014
20th-century Indonesian people